Bernardino de Leis, C.R.L. (died 1506) was a Roman Catholic prelate who served as Bishop of Cagli (1504–1506),
Bishop of Lavello (1504),
Bishop of Castro di Puglia (1504),
and Bishop of Ischia (1501–1504).

Biography
Bernardino de Leis was ordained a priest in the Canons Regular of the Lateran.
On 27 October 1501, he was appointed during the papacy of Pope Alexander VI as Bishop of Ischia.{
On 8 January 1504, he was appointed during the papacy of Pope Julius II as Bishop of Castro di Puglia.
On 19 January 1504, he was appointed during the papacy of Pope Julius II as Bishop of Lavello.
On 23 February 1504, he was appointed during the papacy of Pope Julius II as Bishop of Cagli.
He served as Bishop of Cagli until his death on 6 January 1506.

References

External links and additional sources
 (Chronology of Bishops) 
 (Chronology of Bishops) 
 (Chronology of Bishops) 
 (Chronology of Bishops) 
 (Chronology of Bishops) 
 (Chronology of Bishops) 

16th-century Italian Roman Catholic bishops
Bishops appointed by Pope Alexander VI
Bishops appointed by Pope Julius II
1506 deaths